Pickering railway station is the southern terminus of the North Yorkshire Moors Railway and serves the town of Pickering in North Yorkshire, England. The first railway arrived in Pickering from the north in 1836, however, it wasn't until the railway was connected from the south in 1845, that the current station was built. The station was closed by British Railways in March 1965, but since 1975, the station has served as the southern terminus of the North York Moors Railway.

History

Whitby and Pickering Railway (1836 to 1845)
Originally, from 1836, Pickering was the southern terminus of the horse worked Whitby and Pickering Railway (W&P) engineered by George Stephenson. The coach shed at the end of the W&P's line stood approximately where the north end of the Y&NM trainshed stands today. The W&P minute books (in The National Archives) also refer to a weighbridge at Pickering but if built its location is unknown.

York and North Midland Railway (1845 to 1854)
In 1845 the W&P was taken over by George Hudson's York and North Midland Railway (Y&NM) and the present station was built (to the design of George Townsend Andrews, opening in 1846. The Y&NM converted the line into a double track steam railway and constructed the link from Pickering to Rillington Junction on the new line from York to Scarborough.

As well as the fine station building the York and North Midland Railway also provided other characteristic Andrews buildings, a stone built goods shed with wooden extension and a gas works - one of the earliest surviving railway gasworks buildings - occupied the area now known as 'the Ropery', the goods shed was demolished to make way for the new road but the gas works retort and purifier house still stands today adjacent to the new road.  It ceased to produce gas when Pickering got its own Gas and Water company; later the NER had it converted into a corn warehouse.  By the 1960s it had become a tyre retailers and subsequently was well restored for use as a café, later becoming a ladies hairdressers.

The Y&NM also built a small brick single-road engine shed, large enough for a single locomotive, the shed was extended by the NER in 1867, retaining the same style (they even dismantled and re-erected the end section of the original building, according to the original contract plans held in the NYMR archives). There was a standard Y&NM house built adjacent to the shed.  Both buildings are still standing today, incorporated into a joinery works. The shed lost its clerestory roof some time in the 1950s according to surviving photographic evidence but for a building about to become redundant (in 1958) BR surprisingly made the roof good as plain slate. This building is not only a rare (if not the only) surviving example of a G.T.Andrews engine shed but it is one of very few rural single track engine sheds still standing.

The Y&NM also provided a number of (mainly single storey) gatekeepers cottages next to those road crossings away from the town centre (Haygate Lane, Mill Lane and Newbridge (2 storey)), all of which still survive.

North Eastern Railway (1854 to 1922)
The North Eastern Railway (NER) made various changes at Pickering, they raised the platforms from almost track level to about the present level, in so doing they had to provide two steps down into every room in the station office block.  They also extended the platforms beyond the limits of the Y&NM trainshed.

The biggest change came with the introduction of block-signalling in 1876.  Signal cabins (the NER name) were erected at Mill Lane, Hungate, Bridge Street, High Mill and Newbridge.  Later as the branches to Scarborough and Helmsley were opened, small signal cabins on the branches were opened to control the single to double track junctions, these were Eastgate and Goslip Bridge.  Of these seven cabins only Newbridge survives today, which was grade II listed in 1975.

Originally there was a small turntable behind the engine shed but it became too small and inconvenient and was replaced by a  turntable north of the station near High Mill signal cabin.

It is not known what arrangements were made to provide engines with water at Pickering in earlier times but the NER erected a standard cast-iron panelled tank on a brick base (similar to the one at Goathland) at the south end of the sidings immediately north of the station.  This tank was filled by a pump located in a pump house between the north end of the Y&NM trainshed and the beck, the water being taken from Pickering Beck.  The tank served three standard NER water columns, on the up and down main lines and on the turntable road.  It also supplied water to the engine shed.

London and North Eastern Railway (1923 to 1947)
Very little changed at Pickering during the London and North Eastern Railway's (LNER) twenty-five year reign.  A new paint scheme, two tone green and cream replaced the NER's brown and cream but most of the NER's characteristic enamel signs remained in use, although the Running in boards were painted over during the Second World War.  Although the LNER brought different locomotives, most of the local trains still consisted mainly of NER stock.

British Railways (1948 to 1965)
Under British Railways (BR) the present station lost its characteristic overall roof in 1952 as an economy measure as corrosion meant it was unsafe. The NYMR was granted Heritage Lottery Funding for a number of schemes at Pickering station which includes reinstatement of the 1845 designed roof, which was projected to be complete by 2010, but was not officially unveiled until April 2011.

At some time in the early BR period (probably at the same time that the overall roof was removed), Pickering lost its characteristic small W.H.Smiths bookstall on the up platform. This bookstall had been there since some time in the NER period, it appears in the background of views taken by local photographer Sidney Smith before and during the first World War, subjects include a local Sunday School outing.  It also appears in a photo of a wedding group on the platform in early BR days, a copy of which is held in the NYMR Archives digital image collection.

On 6 April 1959 the engine shed closed and Pickering's engine requirements were supplied by Malton shed. The turntable was also removed (by then there were no terminating passenger services, both branch lines having closed).

Pickering station carried on as usual until its death knell was sounded in the Beeching Report of 1963 which planned the closure of all railways serving Whitby. Despite a fierce local campaign of opposition the line between Rillington Junction and Grosmont closed for passengers on 8 March 1965. The line from Rillington as far as New Bridge signal box (about a mile north of the station) remained open for goods for a further year, a solitary signalman being retained at Pickering to work all the cabins needed by the goods trains.

Preservation

In 1967, a group of local residents set up the North Yorkshire Moors Railway Society with the aim of preserving the line. Initially, due to a dispute with the local council, the railway terminated at a single wooden platform adjacent to High Mill, north of the station. The stone built Andrews station was re-opened to traffic in May 1975.

Pickering's closed railway lines

In pre-preservation days Pickering was not a terminus; the main line continued south to Rillington Junction and thus to Malton, with connections for York.  The Malton - Whitby service was ended in 1965 as part of the Beeching Axe. Just south of the town was a double junction (at Mill Lane) with the Forge Valley branch turning east for Scarborough.

This line closed in 1950 except for a freight only service to Thornton Dale which succumbed in 1963.  A second branch, the  Gilling and Pickering Line, headed west for Kirbymoorside, Helmsley, Gilling and eventually  on the East Coast Main Line.  This line provided Pickering's through passenger service to York but was closed in 1953.  A bus service, operated by Yorkshire Coastliner, now replaces the railway line to Malton and York.

Part of the course of the old line through the town is now a road called "The Ropery" but the former engine shed has been converted into commercial premises (see above) and the bridge over Pickering Beck now used as a footpath.

Services 
There is also a bus link from York railway station.

References
Notes

Sources

North Eastern Railway, Its Rise and Development; by W.W.Tomlinson (David & Charles 1967 reprint of 1914 original)
North Eastern Railway, Its Rise and Development; by W.W.Tomlinson 1914 original available here

External links

 Train times and information from the North Yorkshire Moors Railway

Heritage railway stations in North Yorkshire
Grade II listed buildings in North Yorkshire
Beeching closures in England
Railway stations in Great Britain opened in 1845
Railway stations in Great Britain closed in 1965
Railway stations in Great Britain opened in 1975
North Yorkshire Moors Railway
Former York and North Midland Railway stations
George Townsend Andrews railway stations
1845 establishments in England
Grade II listed railway stations
Pickering, North Yorkshire